Bashkirdovo is a rural locality (a village) in Yesiplevskoye Rural Settlement, Kolchuginsky District, Vladimir Oblast, Russia. The population was 4 as of 2010.

Geography 
Bashkirdovo is located 23 km east of Kolchugino (the district's administrative centre) by road. Novobusino is the nearest rural locality.

References 

Rural localities in Kolchuginsky District